Hebertshausen station is a railway station in the municipality of Hebertshausen, located in the Dachau district in Upper Bavaria, Germany.

Renaming
The station was renamed on 28 May 2000 from Walpertshofen to Hebertshausen. Walpertshofen is a district of the municipality of Hebertshausen.

References

External links

Munich S-Bahn stations
Railway stations in Bavaria
Railway stations in Germany opened in 1891
1891 establishments in Bavaria
Buildings and structures in Dachau (district)